Del Carril is a surname. Notable people with the name include:

Bonifacio del Carril (1911–1994), Argentine writer and politician
Hugo del Carril (1912–1989), Argentine film actor, film director and tango singer
Jorge del Carril (1904-?), Argentine bobsledder.
Justo del Carril (1923–2008), Argentinian alpine skier and bobsledder 
Salvador María del Carril (1798–1883), Argentine politician

See also
Carril, surname